La pena máxima is a 2022 Peruvian political thriller film, based on the homonymous book written by Santiago Roncagliolo. The film was directed by Michel Gomez and written by Santiago Roncagliolo, and starred Emanuel Soriano, Augusto Mazzarelli, Denisse Dibós and Fiorella Pennano.

Plot 
A man is assassinated in Lima during the Argentina 78 World Cup. Félix Chacaltana, an administrative employee of the government, investigates the murder and discovers an international plot of kidnapping, disappearance and torture. Felix also begins to discover the secret life of the country. Although Peru is apparently about to return to democracy, Peruvian opponents and persecuted Argentines begin to disappear in military operations throughout the city. Felix tries to report him, but no one believes him. Or maybe nobody cares because there is a World Cup. Félix doesn't know it, but he is about to lose his sexual, political and even soccer virginity.

Cast 
The actors participating in this film are:

 Emanuel Soriano as Félix Chacaltana
 Augusto Mazzarelli
 Denisse Dibós
 Fiorella Pennano
 Isamel Contreras
 Ursula Marmol
 Alfonso Dibós
 Sergio Paris
 Josue Cohello

Release 
The film premiered on August 25, 2022 in Peruvian theaters.

References 

2022 films
2022 thriller films
Peruvian political thriller films
2020s Peruvian films
2020s Spanish-language films

2020s political thriller films
Films based on non-fiction books
Films set in Peru
Films shot in Peru
Films about political movements
Films about politicians